The King Is Alive is a 2000 drama film directed by Kristian Levring. The fourth film to be done according to the Dogme 95 rules, it was screened in the Un Certain Regard section at the 2000 Cannes Film Festival.

Plot

A group of tourists are stranded in the Namibian desert when their bus loses its way and runs out of fuel. Canned carrots and dew keep the tourists alive, but they are helplessly entrapped, completely cut off from the rest of the world. As courage and moral fibre weaken and relationships grow shaky, Henry, a theatrical manager, persuades the group to put on Shakespeare's tragedy King Lear. As the tourists work their way through Henry's hand-written scripts for an audience of only the sand dunes and one distant, indigenous watcher, real life increasingly begins to resemble the play.

Cast
 Miles Anderson as Jack
 Romane Bohringer as Catherine
 David Bradley as Henry
 David Calder as Charles
 Bruce Davison as Ray
 Brion James as Ashley
 Peter Khubeke as Kanana (as Peter Kubheka)
 Vusi Kunene as Moses
 Jennifer Jason Leigh as Gina
 Janet McTeer as Liz
 Chris Walker as Paul
 Lia Williams as Amanda

Reception

On review aggregator Rotten Tomatoes, The King Is Alive holds an approval rating of 60%, based on 68 reviews, and an average rating of 6/10. Its consensus reads, "Though the plot feels rather contrived, the ensemble acting in this Dogme 95 film is good." On Metacritic, the film has a weighted average score of 52 out of 100, based on 25 critics, indicating "Mixed or average reviews".

References

External links 
 
 
 
 

2000 films
2000s adventure drama films
Danish-language films
Dogme 95 films
Danish independent films
Films directed by Kristian Levring
Films with screenplays by Anders Thomas Jensen
Films set in Namibia
Namibia
Films set in deserts
2000s survival films
2000 drama films
2001 drama films
2001 films
2000s English-language films